Solvang is a village and statistical area (grunnkrets) in Tjøme municipality, Norway.

The statistical area Solvang, which also can include the peripheral parts of the village as well as the surrounding countryside, has a population of 299.

Solvang is located between Tjøme village in the west and Ormelet in the east. It is considered a part of the urban settlement Tjøme, which covers the central part of the island and has a population of 2,325.

References

Villages in Vestfold og Telemark